Cyrus Maffet Palmer (February 12, 1887 – August 16, 1959) was a Republican member of the U.S. House of Representatives from Pennsylvania.

Cyrus M. Palmer was born in Pottsville, Pennsylvania.  He attended the University of Pennsylvania at Philadelphia, Pennsylvania, in 1907.  He studied law, and was admitted to the bar in 1911 and commenced practice in Pottsville.  He served in the Pennsylvania State House of Representatives from 1916 to 1920, and served as district attorney of Schuylkill County, Pennsylvania, from 1920 to 1927.

Palmer was elected as a Republican to the Seventieth Congress, and was an unsuccessful candidate for renomination in 1928.  After his time in Congress, he resumed the practice of law.  He was an alternate delegate to the Republican National Convention at Philadelphia in 1940.

Palmer was elected judge of the common pleas court of Schuylkill County, twenty-first judicial district of Pennsylvania, in 1931, and reelected in 1941 and 1951.  He became president judge of the court January 1, 1940, and served until his death in Pottsville.  He was buried in Charles Baber Cemetery.

Sources

The Political Graveyard

1887 births
1959 deaths
Burials at Charles Baber Cemetery
Republican Party members of the Pennsylvania House of Representatives
Judges of the Pennsylvania Courts of Common Pleas
Politicians from Pottsville, Pennsylvania
Pennsylvania lawyers
University of Pennsylvania alumni
University of Pennsylvania Law School alumni
Republican Party members of the United States House of Representatives from Pennsylvania
20th-century American politicians
20th-century American lawyers